Iryanthera megistocarpa is a species of plant in the family Myristicaceae. It is endemic to Panama.  It is threatened by habitat loss.

References

Flora of Panama
Myristicaceae
Critically endangered plants
Taxonomy articles created by Polbot